Bukit Tengah is an industrial area in Central Seberang Perai District, Penang, Malaysia. This town is situated very close to the North–South Expressway. It is named after Kampung Bukit Tengah which is located next to the Mercedes-Benz automobile showroom which is next to the expressway.  The town is within a proper of a larger town of Bukit Mertajam, which shares the same postcode of 14000.

Jalan Bukit Tengah or Bukit Tengah road, forms the main trunk road which passes through the centre of the town. This road links Jalan Pengkalan to the north with Jalan Bukit Minyak to the south, which connects major towns in Seberang Perai such as Butterworth, Perai in the northwest, Bukit Mertajam in the east and Juru and Simpang Ampat to the south. Along this stretch of road is Bukit Tengah Industrial Park, Sri Rambai Light Industrial Park and Utaria Industrial Park. Among the companies having factories in Bukit Tengah include Dell, Leader Steel, Guppy Plastic Industry and Alpha Master.

Also located in Bukit Tengah is Highway Auto-City, which a one-stop automobile, food and entertainment venue. Many outdoor events and celebrations like roadshows, concerts, carnivals, exhibitions, motor sports and cultural festivals are being held there.

See also
 Bukit Mertajam
 Bukit Minyak
 Butterworth
 Juru
 Perai

References

Central Seberang Perai District
Populated places in Penang